Shell Lake is a city in Washburn County, Wisconsin, United States. The population was 1,347 at the 2010 census. It is the county seat of Washburn County.

History
A post office called Shell Lake has been in operation since 1880. The city took its name from nearby Shell Lake.

Geography
Shell Lake is located at  (45.733590, -91.917368).

The primary geographical feature of the city is Shell Lake which occupies the geographic center of the city and lies completely within the city limits.

Demographics

2010 census
As of the census of 2010, there were 1,347 people, 594 households, and 357 families residing in the city. The racial makeup of the city was 97.7% White, 0.1% African American, 1.2% Native American, 0.3% Asian, 0.1% from other races, and 0.5% from two or more races. Hispanic or Latino of any race were 0.6% of the population.

There were 594 households, of which 26.4% had children under the age of 18 living with them, 46.1% were married couples living together, 10.4% had a female householder with no husband present, 3.5% had a male householder with no wife present, and 39.9% were non-families. 35.9% of all households were made up of individuals, and 22.7% had someone living alone who was 65 years of age or older. The average household size was 2.16 and the average family size was 2.80.

The median age in the city was 46.1 years. 22% of residents were under the age of 18; 4.9% were between the ages of 18 and 24; 22.1% were from 25 to 44; 24% were from 45 to 64; and 26.9% were 65 years of age or older. The gender makeup of the city was 44.8% male and 55.2% female.

2000 census
As of the census of 2000, there were 1,309 people, 559 households, and 353 families residing in the city. The population density was 211.3 people per square mile (81.6/km2). There were 890 housing units at an average density of 143.7 per square mile (55.5/km2). The racial makeup of the city was 98.62% White, 0.08% African American, 0.38% Native American, 0.08% Asian, 0.08% from other races, and 0.76% from two or more races. Hispanic or Latino of any race were 0.99% of the population.

There were 559 households, out of which 23.6% had children under the age of 18 living with them, 51.2% were married couples living together, 8.8% had a female householder with no husband present, and 36.7% were non-families. 32.2% of all households were made up of individuals, and 19.7% had someone living alone who was 65 years of age or older. The average household size was 2.16 and the average family size was 2.69.

In the city, the population was spread out, with 19.3% under the age of 18, 7.2% from 18 to 24, 20.2% from 25 to 44, 23.8% from 45 to 64, and 29.6% who were 65 years of age or older. The median age was 47 years. For every 100 females, there were 83.6 males. For every 100 females age 18 and over, there were 83.5 males.

The median income for a household in the city was $33,073, and the median income for a family was $42,917. Males had a median income of $35,313 versus $20,417 for females. The per capita income for the city was $18,675. About 4.4% of families and 8.6% of the population were below the poverty line, including 7.9% of those under age 18 and 13.1% of those age 65 or over.

Government

Shell Lake is the county seat of Washburn County. The current mayor is Sally Peterson.

Education
Shell Lake is served by the Shell Lake School District, which operates Shell Lake High School.

Shell Lake Arts Center offers arts education camp in fine art, theater, and music for school-aged children and teens. It operates the oldest summer jazz camps for youth in the nation, taught by master musicians and teachers from Chicago, St. Paul-Minneapolis, Milwaukee, the University of Wisconsin System, the University of Minnesota and elsewhere.

Wisconsin Indianhead Technical College (WITC) has its administrative offices in Shell Lake.

Transportation
U.S. Highway 63, the major north-south arterial for the city, passes along the western shore of Shell Lake. County Road B serves as a northern east-west arterial and city limit and County Road D serves as the southern limit and east-west arterial. Both provide access to the U.S. Highway 53 corridor.

Airport
Shell Lake Municipal Airport (ICAO: KSSQ, FAA LID: SSQ) is located southeast of the central business district. It has a year-round 3,711-foot asphalt runway with pilot controlled medium intensity runway lights, PAPI visual glide slope indicators and both GPS and VOR/DME based instrument approaches. It averages over 12,600 takeoffs and landings per year.

Emergency services
Shell Lake Police Department serves the city with three full-time officers and two part-time officers. Its Chief of Police is David Wilson.

Established in 1898, the Shell Lake Fire Department serves the City of Shell Lake and 180 square miles of territory in the towns of Barronett, Bashaw, Beaver Brook, and Sarona in Washburn County and the towns of Dewey and Roosevelt in Burnett County. The Shell Lake Fire Department assists the Wisconsin Department of Natural Resources in wildland fire protection, cold water and ice rescue training, water rescues, auto extrications, and other services.

Ambulance service is provided by North Memorial Medical Center's Spooner/Shell Lake station.

Notable people
 Hans M. Laursen, businessman and politician, lived in Shell Lake.
 Patricia Spafford Smith, businesswoman and politician, was born in Shell Lake.

See also
 List of cities in Wisconsin

References

External links

 

Cities in Wisconsin
Cities in Washburn County, Wisconsin
County seats in Wisconsin